Philip or Phil Turner may refer to:

 Philip Turner (writer) (1925–2006), English writer
 Philip J. Turner, architect and educator
 Phillip Turner (diplomat) (born 1960), New Zealand Ambassador to Korea (2018-present)
 Phil Turner (footballer, born 1962), English football player
 Phil Turner (footballer, born 1927), English football inside forward